The Kaiser Aluminum Hour is a dramatic anthology television series which was broadcast in prime time in the United States during the 1956-57 season by NBC.

The Kaiser Aluminum Hour was shown on alternate Tuesday nights at 9:30 pm Eastern time in rotation with the longer-running Armstrong Circle Theatre, with the first broadcast airing on July 3, 1956 and the final one on June 18, 1957. As can be surmised from the title, the program was sponsored by the Kaiser Aluminum Company. Unlike low-budget anthology series such as Fireside Theater, The Kaiser Aluminum Hour featured many well-known Hollywood actors of the era, including Paul Newman (who appeared in the first telecast, Army Game), Ralph Bellamy, MacDonald Carey, Hume Cronyn, Robert Culp, Kim Hunter, William Shatner, Forrest Tucker, Jack Warden, Dennis Hopper, and Natalie Wood.

References 
 Brooks, Tim and Marsh, Earle, The Complete Directory to Prime Time Network and Cable TV Shows

External links 
 
The Kaiser Aluminum Hour at CVTA with episode list

1950s American anthology television series
1956 American television series debuts
1957 American television series endings
NBC original programming
Black-and-white American television shows
English-language television shows
Kaiser Aluminum